Rodion Syamuk (born 11 March 1989) is a Ukrainian professional footballer who plays for Akzhayik.

Honours
Akzhayik
 Kazakhstan Cup: runner-up: 2022

References

External links 
 
 
 

1989 births
Living people
Ukrainian footballers
Belarusian footballers
Association football goalkeepers
Ukrainian expatriate footballers
Expatriate footballers in Poland
Expatriate footballers in Russia
Expatriate footballers in Kazakhstan
Ukrainian expatriate sportspeople in Belarus
Belarusian Premier League players
Belarusian First League players
Russian Premier League players
FC Dynamo Brest players
FC Volna Pinsk players
FC Slavia Mozyr players
FC Smorgon players
FC Granit Mikashevichi players
FC Torpedo-BelAZ Zhodino players
FC Tambov players
FC Akzhayik players